Seducción (Spanish "seduction") may refer to:

Film and TV
Seduction (1981 film) (redirect from La seducción) 1981 Spanish drama film directed by Arturo Ripstein
Seducción (telenovela) 1986

Music
Seducción (album) album by Jennifer Peña 2004
Seducción (es), album by Myriam Hernández
"Seducción" (song) by Thalía 2006
"Seducción", song by Yaga & Mackie from Clase Aparte